Boulder Creek High School is a high school in Anthem, Arizona. It serves grades 9-12 for the Deer Valley Unified School District.

Athletics
Boulder Creek's Jaguars are members of the Arizona Interscholastic Association (AIA) and compete in the Desert Valley Conference. School colors are red, black and white. The following AIA-sanctioned sports are offered:

Badminton (girls) 
Baseball (boys)
Basketball (girls and boys) 
Beach volleyball (girls) 
Cross country (girls and boys) 
Football (boys) 
Golf (girls and boys) 
Soccer (girls and boys)
Softball (girls)
Swim and dive (girls and boys) 
Tennis (girls and boys) 
Track and field (girls and boys) 
Volleyball (girls and boys) 
Wrestling (girls and boys)
E-Sports (girls and boys)

References

External links
Boulder Creek High School
Maricopa County Library District: North Valley Regional

Public high schools in Arizona
North Valley Regional
Educational institutions established in 2004
Schools in Maricopa County, Arizona
2004 establishments in Arizona